"Man'O'War" (sometimes stylized as manOwar) is a song by American musician Prince for his twenty-third studio album, Rave Un2 the Joy Fantastic (1999). It was released as a promotional single in 2000. The song was written and produced solely by Prince and recorded in 1999 during sessions for the album.

"Man'O'War" is a rock and funk song that takes influence from soul. The track was issued as a CD single, which included three different versions of the song. Due to it not being a commercial single, the song was not eligible to enter any record charts.

Background and recording 
"Man'O'War" was written and produced in 1999 by Prince. The track was recorded in Chanhassen, Minnesota at Paisley Park Studios and in Burbank, California at O'Henry Sound Studios.

Track listing

Credits and personnel 

 Prince – vocals, lyrics, production, recording, mixing
 Hans-Martin Buff – recording, mixing
 Kirk A. Johnson – percussion

 The NPG Orchestra – strings
 Parke – artwork

References 

1999 songs
Prince (musician) songs
Song recordings produced by Prince (musician)
Songs written by Prince (musician)